The Masset Formation is a volcanic formation on Graham Island of Haida Gwaii in British Columbia, Canada. It consists of calc-alkaline volcanic rocks related to subduction of the pre-existing Farallon Plate. The Masset Formation is part of the Pemberton Volcanic Belt.

See also
Volcanism in Canada
List of volcanoes in Canada
Geology of British Columbia
Geography of British Columbia

References

Volcanism of British Columbia
Stratigraphy of British Columbia
Graham Island